Hornsey  was a constituency that returned one Member of Parliament (MP) to the House of Commons of the UK Parliament, 1885 — 1983. It was then largely replaced by Hornsey & Wood Green.  Its voters using the first-past-the-post system elected the Conservative Party candidate at each election. Its closest result was a 1.29% majority at the 1966 election which saw the start of the Second Wilson Ministry.  From 1945 onwards the runners-up in the seat were the Labour Party candidates.

History 
From 1885 to 1918, the constituency was a county division of Middlesex, and in 1918 it became a parliamentary borough. From 1950 it was a borough constituency.

Boundaries
1885–1918: The Parishes of Hornsey (including South Hornsey) and Finchley (and the area included in the Parliamentary Boroughs of the City of London, Finsbury, and Islington for many wealthy voters this sub-provision gave a choice of which seat to vote for).

1918–1974: The Municipal Borough of Hornsey.

1974–1983: The London Borough of Haringey wards of Central Hornsey, Crouch End, Fortis Green, Highgate, Muswell Hill, South Hornsey, Stroud Green, and Turnpike.

Members of Parliament

Election results

Elections in the 1880s 

McGarel-Hogg was elevated to the peerage, becoming Lord Magheramorne, causing a by-election.

Elections in the 1890s

Elections in the 1900s

Elections in the 1910s 

General Election 1914–15:

Another General Election was required to take place before the end of 1915. The political parties had been making preparations for an election to take place and by July 1914, the following candidates had been selected; 
Unionist: Lawrence Dundas
Liberal:

Elections in the 1920s

Elections in the 1930s 

General Election 1939–40:

Another General Election was required to take place before the end of 1940. The political parties had been making preparations for an election to take place and by the Autumn of 1939, the following candidates had been selected; 
Conservative: Euan Wallace
Labour: JT Murphy

Elections in the 1940s

Elections in the 1950s

Archive footage of the result and speeches from 3:57: https://www.youtube.com/watch?v=yTmt5Rz-DTA

Elections in the 1960s

Elections in the 1970s

References

Parliamentary constituencies in London (historic)
Constituencies of the Parliament of the United Kingdom established in 1885
Constituencies of the Parliament of the United Kingdom disestablished in 1983
Hornsey